The ASUN Men's Soccer Tournament is the conference championship tournament in soccer for the ASUN Conference (previously the Trans America Athletic Conference and Atlantic Sun Conference). The tournament has been held every year since 1978 except in 2020, when the ASUN moved its soccer season from fall 2020 to spring 2021 due to COVID-19 issues (resulting in two tournaments in calendar 2021). It is a single-elimination tournament and seeding is based on regular season records. The winner, declared conference champion, receives the conference's automatic bid to the NCAA Men's Division I Soccer Championship.

Winners 

The following is a list of ASUN Tournament winners:

Key

Finals

References

External links